Alberada candida is a species of snout moth in the genus Alberada that was described by Herbert H. Neunzig in 1997 and is known from the US state of California.

References

Moths described in 1997
Phycitini
Endemic fauna of California
Moths of North America
Fauna without expected TNC conservation status